Aleksandr Mitrofanov (born 16 May 1953) is a Soviet sports shooter. He competed at the 1976 Summer Olympics and the 1980 Summer Olympics.

References

1953 births
Living people
Soviet male sport shooters
Olympic shooters of the Soviet Union
Shooters at the 1976 Summer Olympics
Shooters at the 1980 Summer Olympics
Sportspeople from Moscow